Provincial road N306 (N306) is a road connecting N307 near Dronten with Provincial road N302 (Netherlands) and Provincial road N707 (Netherlands) near Harderwijk.

External links

306
306